Jahangirpur is a town/hamlet and a city in Jewar Tehsil in Gautam Buddha Nagar district of Uttar Pradesh, India. It comes under Jahangirpur Panchayath. It belongs to Gautam Buddha Nagar Division . It is located 32 km towards South from District headquarters Noida. 424 km from State capital Lucknow. Jahangirpur is surrounded by Tappal Tehsil towards South, Hassanpur Tehsil towards South, Palwal Tehsil towards west, Dankaur Tehsil towards North and Palwal, Hodal, Faridabad, Sikandrabad are some nearby Cities to the town.

Famous Personalities 
 
 Pandit Narendra Sharma

Geography 
Jahangirpur is mainly connected to other major cities and towns through roads mostly by G T Road and Yamuna Expressway.

There is no railway station near to Jahangirpur in less than 10 km. How ever Khurja Railway Junction is a major railway station about 12 km from the town. Another, Faridabad Railway Station, is 45 km from Jahangirpur.

Demographics
As of 2011 Indian Census, Jahangirpur had a total population of 11,006, of which 5,819	were males and 5,187 were females. Population within the age group of 0 to 6 years was 1,777. The total number of literates in Jahangirpur was 5,906, which constituted 53.7% of the population with male literacy of 61.8% and female literacy of 44.6%. The effective literacy rate of 7+ population of Jahangirpur was 64%, of which male literacy rate was 74.1% and female literacy rate was 52.8%. The Scheduled Castes population was 1,337. Jahangirpur had 1818 households in 2011.

References

Cities and towns in Gautam Buddh Nagar district